Astronomy is the fifth full-length album by the Christian rock band Bleach.  It was released in 2003 under Tooth & Nail Records. This album was dedicated to Captain Josh Byers who was killed in the Iraq War on July 23, 2003.  He was the brother of band members Milam Byers and Jared Byers.

Track listing
"Get Up" – 3:10
"December" – 2:47
"Plan to Pull Through" – 3:40
"Jaded Now" – 4:40
"Astronomy" – 2:55
"Living" – 3:06
"Nineteen" – 3:34
"Patience" – 3:33
"Breakthrough" – 4:21
"Tired Heart" – 4:48
"Moving On" – 3:13

References

Bleach (American band) albums
2003 albums
Tooth & Nail Records albums